The Journal of Animal Ethics (JAE) is a multidisciplinary peer-reviewed journal which explores the ethical relationship between humans and animals. It is published by the University of Illinois Press, in partnership with the Ferrater Mora Oxford Centre for Animal Ethics. The journal is co-edited by Andrew and Clair Linzey. It was formerly co-edited with Priscilla Cohn. The journal has been published annually since 2011. Its content consists of scholarly articles, reviews and argument pieces.

See also 
 Between the Species
 Etica & Animali
 Relations. Beyond Anthropocentrism

References

External links 
 

Animal ethics journals
Annual journals
English-language journals
Publications established in 2011